Microstigma rotundatum, the helicopter damselfly, is a species of damselflies belonging to the family Pseudostigmatidae.

Description
Microstigma rotundatum is the most common species within the family. These damselflies have a long, thin body and large wings with a dense venation. The apex of the forewings has large yellow flecks and the pseudostigma shows many cells.

Biology
These damselflies mainly prey on web-building spiders. Larvae develop in water-filled crevices of fallen trees and in phytotelmata, the bodies of water held by some plants (bromeliads).

Distribution and habitat
This species is present in South America (Peru, Ecuador, Colombia, Venezuela, Bolivia, Amazonas). It lives in tropical primary lowland forests.

Bibliography
 de Selys Longchamps, E. (1860) Synopsis des Agrionines. Première légion: Pseudostigma., Bulletin Academie royale Belgique Serie 2 10 (6): 9-27.
 Odonata: Catalogue of the Odonata of the World. Tol J. van.

References

Pseudostigmatidae
Odonata of South America
Arthropods of Colombia
Insects described in 1860
Taxa named by Edmond de Sélys Longchamps